Familial myxovascular fibromas present with multiple verrucous papules on the palms and fingers, which on biopsy show focal neovascularization and mucin-like changes in the papillary dermis.

See also
 List of cutaneous conditions

References

Dermal and subcutaneous growths